Đorđe Svetličić (born 5 January 1974) is a Serbian former footballer who played as a defender.

Club career
After starting out at Grafičar Beograd, Svetličić joined Partizan in 1993. He spent six seasons with the Crno-beli, helping them win four national championships and two national cups. In 1999, Svetličić moved abroad to Belgium and signed with Germinal Beerschot. He would also play for Cercle Brugge (2003–2006) and Gent (2006–2008), before returning to Germinal Beerschot.

International career
Svetličić made his international debut for FR Yugoslavia in a friendly against Russia (1–0 win) on 20 August 1997. He played his second and last match for the national team in a friendly against Argentina (3–1 loss) on 25 February 1998.

Honours
Partizan
 First League of FR Yugoslavia: 1993–94, 1995–96, 1996–97, 1998–99
 FR Yugoslavia Cup: 1993–94, 1997–98

References

External links
 
 
 

1974 births
Living people
Footballers from Belgrade
Serbia and Montenegro footballers
Serbian footballers
Association football defenders
Serbia and Montenegro international footballers
FK Partizan players
Beerschot A.C. players
Cercle Brugge K.S.V. players
K.A.A. Gent players
First League of Serbia and Montenegro players
Belgian Pro League players
Serbia and Montenegro expatriate footballers
Serbian expatriate footballers
Expatriate footballers in Belgium
Serbia and Montenegro expatriate sportspeople in Belgium
Serbian expatriate sportspeople in Belgium